Mahmona Khan (born 16 October 1973) is a Norwegian author, writer, journalist and has been a social commentator.

Early life and journalistic career 

Khan was born in Norway in 1973 to parents who had emigrated to Oslo at the beginning of the 1970s. She grew up in the Oslo neighborhood Romsås, but lived in Pakistan from when she was eight to eleven years of age.

She started X-plosiv, a magazine for youth from minority backgrounds in 1995. The magazine later became an online site which Khan edited from 2007 to 2010.

She worked as a political journalist in Dagbladet in 1998 and then in LO-aktuelt, a magazine for the Norwegian Confederation of Trade Unions, from 2000 to 2009.

In 2010, Khan was one of two Norwegian representatives at the first Presidential Summit on Entrepreneurship which President Barack Obama announced in his 2009 Cairo speech and whose aim was to strengthen ties between entrepreneurs and business leaders in Muslim communities worldwide and the United States.

Books 

In 2009, Khan published the book Tilbakeblikk – Da pakistanerne kom (English: Looking back – When the Pakistanis came to Norway). The book documents the lives of five Pakistanis that came to Norway as labour immigrants in the 1970s and ended up staying in the country although this was often planned from the beginning. One of the featured men is her father. The Pakistani men often worked in factories, cleaning, or as tram drivers in Oslo. Most of the women did not work outside the home. Khan highlights the hardship and frugality of the first generation and how they were focused on giving the second generation of Pakistanis in Norway better opportunities than they had themselves.
 
Together with Nazneen Khan-Østrem, Khan co-edited the book Utilslørt – Muslimske råtekster (Unveiled - Muslim Raw Sketches), an anthology with text by 19 Muslim women in Norway, which was published in 2011.

Khan's first novel Skitten snø (Dirty Snow) was published in 2011. The book which targeted youths tells the story of a young Pakistani rape victim and how she and three other girls in Groruddalen in Oslo seek revenge without involving the police as reporting the rape would harm the reputation of the girl's fatly good reviews and a wide readership. Two follow-up novels Fra Oslo til Lahore (From Oslo to Lahore) and "Når du minst venter det" were later published in 2013 and 2015. Mahmona Khan is also the creator and writer of the TV-series "Skitten snø", Tainted produced by Miso Film Norway and broadcast by NRK.

Personal life
Khan is married with two children. The family resides in Nordstrand, Oslo.

References 

https://www.imdb.com/title/tt11202814/

External Links 

1973 births
Living people
Writers from Oslo
Norwegian people of Pakistani descent
Norwegian expatriates in Pakistan
Journalists from Oslo
Norwegian non-fiction writers
Norwegian women non-fiction writers 
Norwegian writers of young adult literature
Norwegian women writers
Norwegian Muslims
Women writers of young adult literature